Ricky Ricardo Cristian Cawor (born 26 January 1998) is an Indonesian professional footballer who plays as a forward for Liga 1 club PSS Sleman.

Club career

Persipura Jayapura
He was signed for Persipura Jayapura to play in Liga 1 in the 2021–22 season after scoring 11 goals at 2021 Pekan Olahraga Nasional. Cawor made his first-team debut on 6 January 2022 in a match against Persela Lamongan at the Kapten I Wayan Dipta Stadium, Gianyar Regency. He also scored his first goal for the team in injury time.

Persija Jakarta
Cawor was signed for Persija Jakarta to play in Liga 1 in the 2022–23 season. He made his league debut on 23 July 2022 in a match against Bali United at the Kapten I Wayan Dipta Stadium, Gianyar.

PSS Sleman
On 29 January 2023, Cawor signed a contract with Liga 1 club PSS Sleman from Persija Jakarta. Cawor made his league debut for the club in a 2–0 lose against Persib Bandung, coming on as a substituted Derry Rachman.

Career statistics

Club

Notes

References

External links
 
 Ricky Cawor at Liga Indonesia

1998 births
Living people
Indonesian Christians
Indonesian footballers
Liga 1 (Indonesia) players
Persipura Jayapura players
Persija Jakarta players
Association football forwards
People from Merauke Regency
Sportspeople from Papua